Chylocladia is a genus of red algae belonging to the family Champiaceae.

The genus has almost cosmopolitan distribution.

Species:

Chylocladia articulata 
Chylocladia torulosa 
Chylocladia unistratosa 
Chylocladia verticillata

References

Florideophyceae
Red algae genera